Pyar ka Sapna is a 1969 Bollywood film starring Ashok Kumar, Mala Sinha, Biswajeet, Helen and others.

The film was produced by T.C. Dewan and directed by Hrishikesh Mukherjee, with music by Chitragupta, lyrics and dialogues by Rajendra Krishan, story by Hari Zutshi and screenplay by S.K. Prabhakar. Actor Rajan Haksar (who played the role of Prakash Malhotra in the film) was an associate producer.

The film was shot in India and Europe.

Plot 
An old couple meets a traditional girl Sudha, who is going on a pilgrimage with her mother, in a train. They find her a suitable match for their son Ramesh and think she will set him right, for they believe he's too influenced by a different lifestyle (drinking and partying till late with friends).

Ramesh's father, Jwala Prasad asks Ramesh to marry Sudha before he leaves for London, or he would not provide for the expenses abroad. Ramesh agrees to the marriage, but leaves for London soon after the wedding ceremony, without even seeing his wife. He meets Gupte while traveling on a ship and becomes friends with him. He also meets Jenny in London and is friends with her, though Jenny loves him.

Shankarnath finds a distraught Sudha and teacher her English, helps her learn the ways of the world, so she can find Ramesh and win his heart. Sudha then travels to London, under Shankarnath's tutelage, and stays with his acquaintance, Mr. Malhotra. She assumes the name of Sushma, and meets Ramesh, who falls for her.

However, things become complicated when Shankarnath discovers that Jenny is his long-lost granddaughter. How Sudha and Ramesh come together when all the truths are revealed forms the story from then onwards.

Cast 
 Ashok Kumar as Shankarnath
 Mala Sinha as Sudha/ Sushma
 Biswajeet as Ramesh
 Helen as Jenny
 Johnny Walker as Gupte
 Durga Khote as Sudha's mother
 Rajan Haksar Mr Prakash Malhotra
 Bipin Gupta as Jwala Prasad (Ramesh's father)
 Mridula Rani as Parvati (Ramesh's mother)
 Naina as Renu (Ramesh's sister)

Songs

References

External links 
 Pyar ka Sapna on YouTube
 

1960s Hindi-language films
1969 films
Films shot in Europe